Islampur,, formerly known as Brahmangaon, is a village in Syedpur Shaharpara Union of Jagannathpur Upazila in the district of Sunamganj, Sylhet, Bangladesh.

History

Islampur Jame Masjid
In the 18th century, a Mosque was established on the west side of the village, which was named "Islampur Jame Masjid", with the consent of all to address the needs of the people. At that time there was no mosque in the village other than that of the neighbouring village Syedpur. Historical sources suggest that the village is named after the mosque. However, it is disputed.

Demographics
According to the Population Census 2011 performed by Bangladesh Bureau of Statistics, the total population here is 993. There are 165 households in total.

Geography
Islampur village is bordering with Budhrail and Shaharpara on the north, Shewra and Alagdi on the south, Sunathonpur and Patkura on the east, Gosh Gaon and  Teghoria on the west.

Mouza
It has two Mouza: Brahmangaon and Sunatonpur.

Etymology
"Islampur" is a combination of two words: Islam and pur. Islam is derived from the Arabic root "Salema", which literally means peace, purity, submission and obedience. And pur means village or city. So, "Islampur" means the village of peace.

Education

Primary school
 Anuchandra Govt. Primary School
 Sunatonpur Govt. Primary School

Secondary school
 Shah Jalal High School
 Syedpur Pilot High School

College
Syedpur Adarsha College

Languages
The local people speak Sylheti. Bangla and English languages are taught in schools. And, the educated section of the population can understand and speak English.

Picture Gallery

See also
 List of villages in Bangladesh
 Syedpur Shaharpara Union

References

External links
 

Villages in Jagannathpur Upazila